The Japanese Elm cultivar Ulmus davidiana var. japonica  'Jacan' is a cold-resistant selection from Canada. The tree was raised by the Morden Research Station, Morden, Manitoba in the 1980s.

Description

'Jacan' develops a rounded crown form typical of the species; the foliage turns a deep red in autumn. The species does not sucker from roots.

Pests and diseases
The tree is moderately resistant to Dutch elm disease, and elm leaf beetle Xanthogaleruca luteola . The tree's foliage was adjudged "resistant" to Black Spot by the Plant Diagnostic Clinic of the University of Missouri .

Cultivation
'Jacan' has not been widely planted in Canada owing to restrictions imposed by the Canadian government on the movement of elms across the country, which severely limited its potential market. The tree was introduced to the UK (see Accessions) and Italy from Canada in the early 1980s, but was never in commerce in either country and thus remains very rare; it is not known to have been introduced to Australasia.

Hybrids
'Jacan' was crossed with 'Sapporo Autumn Gold' by the Istituto per la Protezione delle Piante, Florence; the selection identified as 'FL441'. Although it performed well in trials, being noted for its abundant foliage, 'FL441' was never patented or released to commerce.

Accessions
North America
None known.
Europe
Brighton & Hove City Council, UK, NCCPG National Elm Collection, UK champion: Sussex University campus, 15 m high, 31 cm d.b.h. in 2002, (listed as U. japonica 'Jacan').
Grange Farm Arboretum, Sutton St James, Spalding, Lincolnshire, UK. Acc. no. not known.
Sir Harold Hillier Gardens, UK. Acc. nos. 1981.0133, 1982.4002 (listed as U. japonica 'Jacan').

Nurseries
North America
Patmore Nursery , Brandon, Manitoba, Canada.
Sun Valley Garden Centre , Eden Prairie, Minnesota, US.
Europe
None known.

References

Japanese elm cultivar
Ulmus articles with images
Ulmus